Cascade Gorge is an unincorporated community in Jackson County, Oregon, United States. It lies along the Rogue River downstream of Prospect near the upper end of Lost Creek Lake. Oregon Route 62 (Crater Lake Highway) passes through Cascade Gorge. The South Fork Rogue River enters the main stem slightly upstream of Cascade Gorge on the opposite (left) bank.

References

Unincorporated communities in Jackson County, Oregon
Unincorporated communities in Oregon